Leyton Mafuta (born 31 March 1970) is a Zambian judoka. He competed in the men's extra-lightweight event at the 1992 Summer Olympics.

References

1970 births
Living people
Zambian male judoka
Olympic judoka of Zambia
Judoka at the 1992 Summer Olympics
Place of birth missing (living people)